Batimastat (mnemonic: batty-mustard) (INN/USAN, codenamed BB-94) is a drug that was invented by Laurie Hines of British Biotech (now Vernalis). It is an antimetastatic drug that belongs to the family of drugs called angiogenesis inhibitors. It acts as a matrix metalloproteinase inhibitor (MMPI) by mimicking natural MMPI peptides. Dan Lednicer wrote about this compound in book #6 of his organic drug synthesis series.

Batimastat was the first MMPI that went into clinical trials. First results of a Phase I trial appeared in 1994. The drug reached Phase III but was never marketed; mainly because it couldn't be administered orally (as opposed to the newer and chemically similar MMPI marimastat), and injection into the peritoneum caused peritonitis. 

It is well-known that other methods of administration include transdermal (skin lotion) as well as rectal suppositories.

References 

Hydroxamic acids
Matrix metalloproteinase inhibitors